Robert Price or Bob Price may refer to:

Politics
Robert Price (judge) (1653–1733), British judge and politician
Sir Robert Price, 2nd Baronet (1786–1857), Member of Parliament
Sir Robert Price (Liberal politician) (1854–1926), British Member of Parliament for East Norfolk, 1892–1918
Bob Price (Nevada politician) (born 1936), Member of the Nevada General Assembly
Bob Price (Texas politician) (1927–2004), U.S. Representative from Texas
Robert T. Price (1903–1982), Associate Justice of the Kansas Supreme Court

Religion
Robert Price (bishop) (died 1666), Bishop of Ferns and Leighlin
Robert Price (priest) (1905–1981), Anglican priest, Dean of Hereford Cathedral
Robert M. Price (born 1954), American theologian and writer

Other
Robert Price (1717–1761), English gentleman artist and musician
Robert Price (engineer) (1929–2008), American electrical engineer
Robert I. Price (1921–2019), American Coast Guard admiral
Robert M. Price (business executive) (1930–2020), American computer scientist and business executive, CEO of Control Data Corporation
Robert Price (attorney) (1932–2016), Commissioner of Investigations, New York State; CEO Price Communications
Robert Earl Price (born 1942), African American playwright and poet
Bob Price (Canadian football) (born 1955), tight end coach and recruiting coordinator for the Virginia Cavaliers